The 73rd FIFA Congress was held in BK Arena in Kigali, Rwanda, on 16 March 2023.

2023 presidential election
On 31 March 2022, during the 72nd FIFA Congress in Doha, incumbent FIFA President Gianni Infantino announced his candidacy for a second term.
After the deadline on 18 November 2022, he was the only candidate.

Voting results

References

External links
FIFA Congress official page

FIFA Congresses
2023 in association football
2023 conferences
2023 elections
Sport in Rwanda
2010s in Rwanda
March 2023 sports events in Africa